The Mystical Gate of Reincarnation is an EP by Canadian death metal, Kataklysm and contains their demo, The Death Gate Cycle of Reincarnation and the bonus track The Orb of Uncreation.

Track listing

Personnel
 Sylvain Houde – lead vocals
 Jean-François Dagenais – lead guitar
 Stéphane Côté – rhythm guitar
 Maurizio Iacono – bass, backing vocals
 Ariel Saïed – drums

Production
 Marcus Staiger - Producer
 Pierre Rémillard - Engineering, Mixing
 Sv Bell – Cover artwork
 Terry Petrilli – Photography

Kataklysm albums
1993 EPs